Ricardo Cardoso may refer to:

Ricardo Cardoso (judoka) (1963–1991), Brazilian judoka
Ricardo Cardoso (footballer) (born 2001), Santomean footballer